Grobla may refer to the following places in Poland:
Grobla, Lower Silesian Voivodeship (south-west Poland)
Grobla, Radomsko County in Łódź Voivodeship (central Poland)
Grobla, Lublin Voivodeship (east Poland)
Grobla, Świętokrzyskie Voivodeship (south-central Poland)
Grobla, Greater Poland Voivodeship (west-central Poland)